Linear A is a Unicode block containing the characters of the ancient, undeciphered Linear A.

History
The following Unicode-related documents record the purpose and process of defining specific characters in the Linear A block:

References 

Unicode blocks